Soroti Rock is a striking granite formation prominent that towers above Soroti town center, Uganda, offering good views across to Lake Kyoga and Mt. Elgon from the pinnacle.  The rock rises approximately 90m out of plain landscape.

References

Rock formations of Africa
Landforms of Uganda